The Juyan Lake ((shown on Chinese maps as 嘎顺淖尔 Gāshùn nào'ěr or  嘎顺诺尔, Gāshùn nuò'ěr) for western lake, Sogo Nuur for eastern lake) is a former lake in the Gobi desert. It is located in the western part of Inner Mongolia, in 
Ejin Banner of the Alxa League, near the border with Outer Mongolia. The eastern lake reappeared in 2005.

The Juyan Lake basin is a rare wetland located in a desert. The Juyan lake is one of three former terminal lakes located at the outer edges of the Heihe River ('Black River') catchment which formed a large inland delta between the Qilian and the Gobi Altay. The Heihe River is also known as the Ruo Shui, also Etsin Gol or Ruo He or Ejin River.

The basin's boundary is formed by the  Mazong Shan mountains to the west, the Heli Shan and Longshou Shan mountains to the south, the Helan Mountains and Lang Shan ranges to the east and the Gobi Altay range to the north.

History
The basin played an important role in ancient times and was historically part of the Hexi Corridor between the 2nd century BC to the 8th century AD.  
"This territory, called Juyan by the Han Chinese, was maintained and garrisoned by the empire from the time of Emperor Wu until the last century of Later Han. Militarily, the outpost of the Great Wall was important for two reasons: as a supply point for the garrisons in the northwest and, perhaps more significant, as a means to deny this prosperous region to the northern nomads. Left undefended, Juyan would have provided an ideal route for attack against the Chinese commanderies of the corridor itself.
During Former Han, therefore, the Zhelu Zhang (Fortress to Block the Enemy), had been constructed by the marshes of the Edsin Gol, and it was from this base, for example, that the general Li Ling went forth on his disastrous attack against the Xiongnu in 99 BC.
South of the Juyan salient, the main line of defences followed the Great Wall, which ran in this region from the passes of Yumen Guan and Yang Guan in Dunhuang commandery of the far west along the northern edge of the Hexi Corridor past Jiuquan, Zhangye and Wuwei."

In fiction
The science fiction series Perry Rhodan features the rocket-shuttle Stardust returning from the Moon in 1971 with alien technology, landing near the point where the Ejin River (called Edsengol) flows into the Juyan Lake (called Goshunsee, i.e. Goshun Lake), not far from the real-life Jiuquan Satellite Launch Center. The area, in which Earth's later capital Terrania is built, remains a central location in the series.

Footnotes

References
  Rafe de Crespigny. 1984. Northern Frontier. The Policies and Strategies of the Later Han Empire. Faculty of Asian Studies, Australian National University. Canberra. 
 Wünnemann, B.,  Hartmann, K. (2002), Morphodynamics and Paleohydrography of the Gaxun Nur Basin, Inner Mongolia, China in: Zeitschrift für Geomorphologie, vol. 126, pp. 147–168.

External links
Paleoenvironment in the lower reaches of Hei River and Juyan Lake
Lake Level Changes Recorded by Tree Rings of Lakeshore Shrubs
Juyan Site
Perrypedia page about the lake in the Perry Rhodan series

Drainage basins of China
Ecoregions of Mongolia
Landforms of Inner Mongolia
Sites along the Silk Road
Alxa League